The women's 1500 metres event at the 1994 Commonwealth Games was held in Victoria, British Columbia

Results

References

1500
1994
1994 in women's athletics